Gamlestaden station is a railway station located in the suburb of Gamlestaden in the Swedish city of Gothenburg, alongside the Norway/Vänern Line. Opened on December 8, 2012, the station has since been served by commuter trains as well as regional Västtrafik trains between Gothenburg and Vänersborg.

References 

Railway stations in Gothenburg